The 8th Cavalry Brigade was a cavalry brigade of the British Army in World War I.  It was formed in Belgium in 1914 and served on the Western Front as part of the 3rd Cavalry Division.  It left the 3rd Cavalry Division on 14 March 1918.

World War I

Formation
The 3rd Cavalry Division began forming at Ludgershall, Wiltshire in September 1914 with just two cavalry brigades (the 6th and the 7th).  To bring the division up to the standard strength of three brigades, the 8th Cavalry Brigade was formed in Belgium on 20 November 1914.  With the addition of its third brigade, 3rd Cavalry Division obtained a third Cavalry Field Ambulance (8th, from England on 23 December) and a third Mobile Veterinary Section (20th, from England on 9 March 1915).

The Brigade was initially formed with the 10th Royal Hussars from 6th Cavalry Brigade and the Royal Horse Guards from 7th Cavalry Brigade on 20 November.  The third regiment, the 1/1st Essex Yeomanry, did not join from the Eastern Mounted Brigade in England until 11 December.  A signal troop joined on formation and G Battery, Royal Horse Artillery (six 13 pounders) joined from V Brigade, RHA of 8th Infantry Division on 25 November.  On 29 February 1916, a Machine Gun Squadron was formed from the machine gun sections of the brigade's constituent regiments.

Chronicle
The brigade served with the 3rd Cavalry Division on the Western Front until March 1918.  It joined the division too late to take part in any of the 1914 actions, but in 1915 the division saw action in the Second Battle of Ypres (Battle of Frezenberg Ridge, 11–13 May) and the Battle of Loos (26–28 September).  1916 saw no notable actions, but in 1917 the division took part in the Battle of Arras (First Battle of the Scarpe, 9–12 April).  At other times, the brigade formed a dismounted unit and served in the trenches (as a regiment under the command of the brigadier).

In March 1918, the 4th (formerly 1st Indian) and 5th (formerly 2nd Indian) Cavalry Divisions were broken up in France.  The Indian elements were sent to Egypt where they formed part of the new 4th and 5th Cavalry Divisions which played a major part in the successful conclusion of the Sinai and Palestine Campaign.  The British and Canadian units remained in France and most of them were transferred to the 3rd Cavalry Division causing it to be extensively reorganized.

The yeomanry regiments were concentrated in the 8th Cavalry Brigade; it left the 3rd Cavalry Division on 14 March 1918, the day after the Canadian Cavalry Brigade joined from 5th Cavalry Division.  It appears to have been dissolved at this point as the constituent regiments (the Essex, Leicestershire and North Somerset Yeomanry) were slated to be converted to cyclist units, G Battery, RHA was posted to XVII Brigade, RHA, and 8th MG Squadron joined 7th Cavalry Brigade.

Units

Commanders
The 8th Cavalry Brigade had the following commanders:

See also

British Army during World War I
British Cavalry Corps order of battle 1914
British cavalry during the First World War

Notes

References

Bibliography

External links
 

Cavalry brigades of the British Army
Military units and formations established in 1914
Military units and formations disestablished in 1918